Spanish Reconquest or just Reconquest is a period of Chilean history that started in 1814 with the royalist victory at the Battle of Rancagua and ended in 1817 with the patriot victory at the Battle of Chacabuco. During this time the supporters of the Spanish Empire restored their control over Chile, while the patriots tried to spread the independentist ideas among the people, mainly through the guerrilla of Manuel Rodríguez Erdoiza. Authors such as the Chileans Julio Heise and Jaime Eyzaguirre prefer to call the period Absolutist Restoration, considering it merely the return to power of the royalists.

See also 

 Chilean War of Independence#Reconquista
 Treaty of Lircay
 Vicente San Bruno
 Army of the Andes
 Crossing of the Andes

1810s in the Captaincy General of Chile